Beckman may refer to:

Beckman (surname)
Arnold Orville Beckman, chemist and entrepreneur
Beckman Coulter, a biomedical laboratory instruments company founded by Arnold O. Beckman
3737 Beckman, an asteroid
 Institutes and research centers supported by the Arnold and Mabel Beckman Foundation
 Beckman Center for Molecular and Genetic Medicine at Stanford University, Stanford, California 
 Beckman Institute at Caltech, California Institute of Technology, Pasadena, California
 Beckman Institute Laser Resource Center (BILRC) at Caltech
 Beckman Institute for Advanced Science and Technology, University of Illinois at Urbana-Champaign 
 Beckman Laser Institute, University of California, Irvine, in Irvine, California
  Beckman Research Institute (BRI) at the City of Hope National Medical Center in Duarte, California, United States
 Schools
Arnold O. Beckman High School, a high school in Irvine, California named after Arnold Orville Beckman
Beckman High School (Dyersville, Iowa), a Roman Catholic high school in Dyersville, Iowa, named for Archbishop Francis J. L. Beckman

See also 

 Beckmann (disambiguation)
 

ru:Бекман